Amici is a lunar impact crater that is located on the rugged far side of the Moon. It lies to the south of the larger crater Icarus, to the north of McKellar.

The rim of Amici has been eroded and distorted by subsequent impacts, so that is now has a somewhat polygonal shape. It has a valley at the southern end that extends toward the satellite crater Amici M. The interior floor has no notable impact formations, but is pock-marked by tiny craterlets.

Satellite craters
By convention these features are identified on lunar maps by placing the letter on the side of the crater midpoint that is closest to Amici.

References

External links
 

Impact craters on the Moon